"The Ways of a Woman in Love" is a song originally recorded by Johnny Cash. It was written for him by Bill Justis and Charlie Rich.

The song was recorded by Cash in July 1958 during his final sessions for Sun Records. and released as a single (Sun 302, with "You're the Nearest Thing to Heaven" on the opposite side) in August.

Composition

Charts

References 

Johnny Cash songs
1958 singles

Songs written by Charlie Rich
Sun Records singles
1958 songs
Songs written by Bill Justis